The 1980 Campionato Italiano di Grouppo 6 season was the fifth season of the Italian Championship Group 6 series.

Results
Races in bold, when also rounds of the World Championship for Makes.

References

Group 6
Italian Championship Group 6